I Love the '90s is a BBC television nostalgia series that examines the pop culture of the 1990s. It was commissioned following the success of I Love the '70s and I Love the '80s, with episodes being 60 minutes long, except for 1990 which was 90 minutes long. The series was executive produced by Alan Brown, with Stephen McGinn serving as series producer. In 2019, the series was repeated as a weekly show lasting 30 minutes per year, with I Love 1993 following on from the I Love 1987 episode in BBC Two's Monday night listings.

Background
There were ten episodes, with one devoted to each year from 1990 to 1999.  Each episode recalled major events (such as the 1991 Gulf War and 1997 death of Diana, Princess of Wales) from the given year, along with popular or memorable films, television series, music, video games and fashion trends, as well as short-lived fads, and was hosted by a celebrity (or celebrities, or in one stance cartoon characters) connected with one of the items from that year.

The final episode, I Love '99, ended with the Baz Luhrmann produced hit single of the year, "Everybody's Free (To Wear Sunscreen)", whilst a montage of all of the BBC "I Love..." episodes, from 1970 to 1999 was shown.

Contributors
The series used many regular contributors, which included Peter Kay, Clare Grogan, Dee Hepburn, Kate Thornton, Stuart Maconie, Emma B, Ice-T, Toyah Willcox, Tommy Vance, Tara Palmer-Tomkinson, Ross Noble, Vernon Kay, Trevor Nelson and many others.

Episodes

I Love 1990 Broadcast: 18 August 2001

Presented by Sheryl Lee (from Twin Peaks). Opening titles: "Doin' the Do" by Betty Boo. Ending credits: "The Power" by Snap!. Produced and directed by Karina Brennan.

The episode features:
 Twin Peaks
 MC Hammer / Vanilla Ice
 Supermodels
 Volkswagen girl advert
 Goodfellas
 Vogueing
 Creature Comforts
 World Cup 90 / Gazza (featuring the England national football team's run to the semi finals of the World Cup, and the iconic status achieved by player Paul Gascoigne)
 Sinéad O'Connor – "Nothing Compares 2 U"
 The Simpsons
 Adamski/ Seal
 Baywatch

I Love 1991 Broadcast: 25 August 2001
Presented by Vic Reeves and Bob Mortimer. Opening titles: "The Size of a Cow" by The Wonder Stuff. Ending credits: "Get the Message" by Electronic. Produced and directed by Martyn Smith.

The episode features:
Chippendales
The Commitments
Häagen-Dazs
Grunge / Nirvana
Vic Reeves Big Night Out
Right Said Fred
Sonic the Hedgehog and Super Mario
Sasha/ The rise of the superstar DJ & UK Club Culture (including Piano House)
The Lovers' Guide

I Love 1992 Broadcast: 1 September 2001

Presented by Mark Owen (from Take That). Opening titles: "It Only Takes a Minute" by Take That. Ending credits: "Stay" by Shakespears Sister. Produced and directed by Andrew Nicholson.

The episode features:
Take That
Gladiators
Wayne's World
Tango advert
The Shamen
For Women (magazines) and Condoms
Reservoir Dogs
Billy Ray Cyrus – "Achy Breaky Heart"
Absolutely Fabulous

I Love 1993 Broadcast: 8 September 2001

Presented by Beavis and Butt-head.  Opening titles: House of Pain – "Jump Around": Ending credits:  New Order – "Regret".

The episode features:
Mr Blobby (iconic bulbous costume character first introduced by Noel Edmunds on TV in late 1992)
Indecent Proposal
John Wayne Bobbitt
East 17
Tattoo & Body piercing
Eternal
Beavis and Butt-head
Boddingtons advert with Melanie Sykes
The X-Files
Shaggy and Jamaican music.

I Love 1994 Broadcast: 15 September 2001

Presented by Eva Herzigova.

The episode features:
Britpop
Four Weddings and A Funeral / "Love Is All Around" by Wet Wet Wet (the hugely successful film and the soundtrack which accompanied it)
 Wonderbra and Tommy Hilfiger fashions,
 OJ Simpson Trial
 Friends
Pulp Fiction

I Love 1995 Broadcast: 29 September 2001

Presented by Edwyn Collins Opening titles: Supergrass – "Alright". Ending credits "A Girl Like You"

The episode features:
 The Usual Suspects
 Club 18-30
 Alcopops
 Alanis Morissette
 CK One
 Guinness advert – Dancing man 
 Braveheart
 Dennis Pennis
 Edwyn Collins

I Love 1996 Broadcast: 6 October 2001

Presented by Amita Dhiri (from This Life).  Opening titles: "Female of the Species" by Space. Ending credits: "Slight Return" by The Bluetones.

The episode featured:
Spice Girls
This Life
Toy Story
Mark Morrison
Euro '96 / "Three Lions" (the England football team's fortunes as hosts and semi-finalists of the European Championships)
Ladettes / The Girlie Show
Trainspotting
"Macarena"
Tomb Raider

I Love 1997 Broadcast: 13 October 2001
Presented by Melinda Messenger.  Opening titles: Republica – "Ready to Go". Ending credits: No Doubt – "Don't Speak"

The episode features:
 Chumbawamba
 Diet Coke man
 The Full Monty
 Melinda Messenger
 The Prodigy
 Teletubbies
 Bridget Jones's Diary
 Driving School and Docusoaps
 Viagra

I Love 1998 Broadcast: 27 October 2001

Presented by Dana International. Opening titles Robbie Williams – "Let Me Entertain You".  Closing credits Fatboy Slim – "The Rockafeller Skank".

The episode features:
 George Michael – gets Arrested/Come out
 SunnyD
 Eurovision 1998
 Cornershop – Brimful of Asha
 Fashion Combat trousers
 Lock, Stock and Two Smoking Barrels
 Coronation Street – Free Deirdre (the campaign to free an iconic TV character after she was wrongly imprisoned for deception)
 There's Something About Mary
 South Park

I Love 1999 Broadcast: 3 November 2001

Presented by Heather Donahue (from The Blair Witch Project). Ending credits: "Livin' la Vida Loca" by Ricky Martin.

The episode features:
Britney Spears (the emergence of a popular teenage American pop star)
Flat Eric
The Blair Witch Project
Hello magazine
The wedding of Posh & Becks
Kelly Brook on The Big Breakfast
Spike Jonze directing the iconic video for Fatboy Slim's "Praise You"
Queer as Folk
Baz Luhrmann's hit "Everybody's Free (To Wear Sunscreen)", playing over a montage of the previous "I Love..." shows from 1970 to 1999.

See also
 I Love the '70s (British TV series)
 I Love the '80s (British TV series)

External links

Notes

Nostalgia television shows
BBC Television shows
2001 British television series debuts
2001 British television series endings
English-language television shows